Joynagar is a village near Kolabagan in Sadar sub-division of West Tripura district of  Tripura.

References 

West Tripura district
Villages in West Tripura district